Nicolas Grozelier (17 August 1692, Beaune – 27 August 1778) was an 18th-century French fabulist.

Biography 
A French writer, Grozelier joined the Oratory of Saint Philip Neri in 1710, aged 18. There, he taught belles-lettres, philosophy and theology. He composed many poems and quite a number of small plays of his, almost always written in an easy and natural style, are quoted. A collection of his fables was published in six books in 1768.

Works 
1760: Fables nouvelles, divisées en six livres, et dédiées a monseigneur le duc de Bourgogne, À Paris, chez Desaint & Saillant
1768: Fables nouvelles, divisées en six livres, et dédiées a monseigneur le Dauphin, À Paris, chez Des Ventes de la Doué
1726–1730: Observations curieuses sur toutes les parties de la physique, extraites et recueillies des meilleurs mémoires, A. Cailleau

External links 
 Nicolas Grozelier on Data.bnf.fr
 Nicomlas Grozelier on Rue des Fables

18th-century French writers
18th-century French male writers
French fabulists
People from Beaune
1692 births
1778 deaths